Durruthy is a surname. Notable people with the surname include:

Freddy Durruthy, Cuban Paralympian athlete 
Juan Roberto Diago Durruthy (born 1971), Cuban contemporary artist
 Oreol Camejo Durruthy (born 1986), Cuban volleyball player